This is a list of swamps in Serbia.

 Bara Zatonja (Široka bara) 
 Bara Kolda 
 Bara Crvenka 
 Bara Šubarka 
 Velika bara (Jasenska) 
 Velika Slatina 
 Veliki siget 
 Gušterice 
 Daraška bara 
 Delečir 
 Zelene bare 
 Zidine 
 Kazuk 
 Karamejdani 
 Karapanđa 
 Kečkeler (Rondetler, Linovo) 
 Lanište 
 Livade 
 Ludoška bara 
 Mali rit 
 Mlaka (Vodoplav) 
 Mostonga 
 Obedska bara 
 Paktovo 
 Pašnjak (Kereš) 
 Peglajz 
 Posavlje 
 Rit 
 Samarin 
 Surzije (Rogač, Gatište) 
 Tonja (Kozjak) 
 Ćiril bara (Senajske bare) 
 Utrina 
 Carska bara (Revenica) 
 Čurug 
 ? 

Serbia, List of swamps
 
Swamps
Lists of coordinates